Chynów  is a village in Grójec County, Masovian Voivodeship, in east-central Poland. It is the seat of the gmina (administrative district) called Gmina Chynów.

The village has a population of 400.

References

Villages in Grójec County
Warsaw Governorate
Warsaw Voivodeship (1919–1939)